Uthavedeeswarar Temple is a Hindu temple in the town of Kuthalam in the Mayiladuthurai district of Tamil Nadu, India. The temple is dedicated to Shiva.

Significance 
Shiva as Uthavedeeswarar is the presiding deity. According to Hindu mythology, Shiva was married to Parvathi at this place and the god is believed to have left his sandals here before embarking for Mount Kailash. The Saivite saint Sambandar has composed hymns in praise of the temple in Thevaram. Several sages like Kashyapa, Angirasa, Gotama, Markandeya, Vashista, Kulastya and Agastya. The temple is counted as one of the temples built on the banks of River Kaveri. It is believed that the river was flowing on both sides of the village.

History
Uthavedeewarar is to estimate 1000 - 2000 years ago. 

Uddhala tree is famous in this temple. it is found only here in this entire world.

References 

 

Shiva temples in Mayiladuthurai district
Padal Petra Stalam